Braniște is a commune in Rîșcani District, Moldova. It is composed of four villages: Avrămeni, Braniște, Reteni and Reteni-Vasileuți.

Notable people
 Alexandru Moșanu (1932–2017), Romanian-Moldavian historian and politician 
 Boris Vieru  (1957–2019), Moldovan politician
 Leonid Tălmaci (born 1954), Moldovan politician, governor of the National Bank of Moldova

References

Communes of Rîșcani District
Populated places on the Prut